Sabir, Azerbaijan may refer to:
Nəbiağalı
Sabir, Shamakhi
Sabirkənd, Shamkir
Səbir